Jonathan Peter Guimarães Tavernari is a Brazilian-Italian professional basketball player from São Bernardo do Campo. He last played for Scafati Basket in the Italian Serie A2 Basket (LBA).

Early years
Tavernari started playing basketball with his mother, Thelma, as a 6-year-old boy in Sao Bernardo. He played with older teams, first being inserted in organized basketball at the age of 9, playing with 
13 years old boys, impressing right away. At 11, he played with 12 years old kids, and became the MVP of the state of São Paulo. Age 12, he became the MVP of the South American continent. After his Under 14 season, achieving yearly regional and state championships, Jonathan played 2 years for the renowned club Esporte Clube Pinheiros, leading them to back-to-back undefeated regional and state championships, amassing a 61-0 record. At 15, he was selected to play with the Brazilian National Team, and 16, became the Team Captain, ending the South American Tournament U16 in 2003 losing to Venezuela, featuring NBA player Greivis Vasquez. After that year, he transferred to the US to continue his education and career.

High school

Tavernari attended Bishop Gorman High School in Nevada. He averaged a state-high 23.1 points per game and 10.2 rebounds per game, leading the Gaels to a 25-2 record, reaching the State Final Four. That season featured Tavernari being nominated to the McDonald's All-American team, as well as Full-Court and Pangos All-American Team. He led Gorman to a national ranking of 17th, with wins over many perennial powerhouses such as Mater Dei and Bishop O'Connell. Up to that point, Tavernari was considered to be the top high schooler to ever come out of Brazil.  He committed to Brigham Young University out of high school.

College career

As a freshman for the Cougars, he was named Mountain West Conference Freshman of the Year while averaging 6.5 points and 2.9 rebounds per game for the regular season conference-champion Cougars.  He was named to the All-MWC Third Team in both his sophomore and junior seasons, setting a program record on both years on three points made.  He was named team captain as a senior for the current 2009–10 season, helping the team off to a 13–1 start. During his senior year, Tavernari opted to become the team's 6th man, helping the Cougars climb into the Top 15. As an "luxurious reserve", he became one of the country's top 6th man, earning mentions from ESPN's Jay Bilas, and becoming Mountain West Conference 6th Man of the Year. Tavernari is one of the few players in MWC history to earn two of its individual awards (Freshman & 6th Man honors). Tavernari finished his tenure at BYU as the winningest player in school history, tapping 105, setting school records in games played (132), three points made, (262), being in the top 15 in points and top 10 in steals and rebounds. During his 4-year tenure in Provo, Jonathan led the Cougars to 4 consecutive Top 25 finishes, including a then-best 10th ranking in over 20 years. JT is one of the all-time greats at BYU, winning back-to-back-to-back MWC championships from 2007-2009.

Professional career
After graduating from BYU, Tavernari signed a 3-year deal contract with Pallacanestro Biella. During his first season, 2010-2011, he did not play, due to transfer issues, and number of foreigners allowed per team. At the end of the season, Jonathan received his Italian Citizenship, due to his father's heritage. In the 2011-2012 season, Tavernari started the season with Biella, playing well in the preseason games, and appearing a few times in the Italian League, Serie A. In January, Pistoia Basket 2000 acquired Jonathan in a loan from Biella for the remainder of the season. On his debut for Pistoia, Jonathan had a brilliant start, going for 16 points and helping the Tuscan team to a home win against LegaDue's Imola. From January to May, Pistoia and Jonathan were neck to neck with Reggio Emilia to win the coveted promotion prize to the first division. Pistoia came up short, and had to try to win the second guaranteed spot through the playoffs. Pistoia lost to Brindisi in the finals, despite Jonathan's incredible performances in the playoffs against Veroli and Scafati. The head coach for Brindisi, Piero Bucchi, mentioned after the game that Jonathan was the best 6th man in the league, and for sure would be part of his All-League Team.
In July 2012, Tavernari signed a 1+1 year-deal with Scafati. In June 2013, JT signed a one-year deal with Esporte Clube Pinheiros, a professional team in São Paulo, Brazil, and the club he grew up playing for. Pinheiros participated in the São Paulo League, the Novo Basquete Brasil, FIBA Americas League, and the World Cup for Clubs against Olympiacos, coming in 2nd place. In July 2014, he then moved back to Europe, to play for Derthona Basket Derthona Basket. For the 2015-2016 season, Tavernari remained in Italy, signing with Agropoli. There he led the newly promoted team to the second best record of the season, being one of the three main players along with Marc Trasolini and Terrence Roderick Jr. The Dolphins were poised for a long post season run, when Tavernari fractured his right foot and missed the remainder of the season. Following his year in Agropoli, JT signed with perennial European contenders Mens Sana Siena.
On July 6, 2018, Tavernari signed a 1-year contract with Lega Basket Serie A (LBA) powerhouse Dinamo Basket Sassari. After strong performances and a great positive presence within the locker room, Dinamo extended Jonathan's contract until 2020.

On July 17, 2018, Tavernari left Sassari after one year and signed with the Italian club Pallacanestro Cantù.

Midway through the 2018-2019 season, Tavernari forced a trade from Cantù back to Scafati, due to financial problems from the Brianzolo team. Jonathan finished the season with a 20 points performance going 6-11 from long range. Jonathan averaged 40% from behind the arc that season.

National team career

Tavernari is also a member of the Brazilian national basketball team.  He made his debut for the team at the 2008 FIBA World Olympic Qualifying Tournament for Men.  He was also a member of the Brazil team that won the gold medal at the 2009 FIBA Americas Championship.  Tavernari saw action in four games off the bench for the Brazilians, scoring nine points each in victories over Mexico and Uruguay. During the summer of 2010, Tavernari helped Brazil win gold at the South American Championships in Neiva, Colombia. While averaging a team second-best 11 points, Tavernari led the team up to the final game in shooting percentage at 60%. He would finish the tournament at 55%.

Personal life
Tavernari is the son of a basketball coaching legend (his mother Thelma), and of a sports administrative figure (father Roberto). He is a member of the Church of Jesus Christ of Latter-day Saints, being baptized on July 16, 2005. On September 9, 2009, he married Kiri Anne, his college sweetheart in Salt Lake City, Utah.
In 2012, Jonathan and Kiri gave birth to their son, Xander. In 2020, the couple welcomed their 2nd child, Zion.

References

External links

LatinBasket.com Profile
Italian League Profile 

1987 births
Living people
Bishop Gorman High School alumni
Brazilian expatriate basketball people in the United States
Brazilian men's basketball players
Brazilian people of Italian descent
BYU Cougars men's basketball players
Dinamo Sassari players
Esporte Clube Pinheiros basketball players
Italian men's basketball players
Lega Basket Serie A players
Mens Sana Basket players
Novo Basquete Brasil players
Pallacanestro Biella players
Pallacanestro Cantù players
People from São Bernardo do Campo
Pistoia Basket 2000 players
Scafati Basket players
Shooting guards
Small forwards
Sportspeople from São Paulo (state)